Breaks Co-Op is a New Zealand band, formed in 1997, initially recorded with Deepgrooves Entertainment and more recently with EMI.

Band
The band members are Andy Lovegrove, Zane Lowe, and Hamish Clark.

Lowe had collaborated with Clark when Lowe was a member of hip-hop group Urban Disturbance. Lowe and Clark formed Breaks Co-Op in Auckland, releasing the electronic album Roofers in 1997 before they both left New Zealand to travel and pursue other interests. They ended up in the UK, where Lowe became a radio DJ and TV presenter.

After several years hiatus, Lowe and Clark started working on new material in 2004, recruiting Andy Lovegrove from artist/producers The Away Team after hearing a vocal demo.

Released in 2005 in New Zealand, The Sound Inside was a double-platinum seller, with lead single "The Otherside" the winner of Song of the Year at the New Zealand Music Awards.

The Co-op toured and relocated to the UK, where their album was released by Parlophone.

The live lineup is Lovegrove on lead vocals and guitar; Rodney Fisher on vocals, lead guitar, mandolin and percussion; Rio Hemopo on bass and vocals; Tom Atkinson on drums; and Clark on turntables, samples, and vocals.

The song "The Otherside" is featured in the Season One Brothers & Sisters episode "Valentine's Day Massacre". 
Also from the album, the song "The Sound Inside" is featured in the Season Seven CSI: Crime Scene Investigation episode "Post Mortem".

The song "Transister" from the album Roofers features New Zealand musician Jordan Reyne as guest vocalist / lyricist.

Discography

Albums

Singles

References

New Zealand electronic music groups
Musical groups established in 1997
EMI Records artists
Electronica music groups